The 2010 FIA GT1 Spa-Francorchamps round was an auto racing event held at the Circuit de Spa-Francorchamps, Francorchamps, Belgium on 29–31 July. The Spa event was the fifth round of the 2010 FIA GT1 World Championship season.  The FIA GT1 round was not the feature race of the weekend as it was a support series for the Spa 24 Hours along with the Cooper Tires British F3, and the Lamborghini Blancpain Super Trofeo.

Qualifying
Mad-Croc Racing Corvette drivers Xavier Maassen and Jos Menten earned pole position in qualifying by setting a lap time 0.2 seconds faster than any other competitor in the third qualifying session.

Qualifying result
For qualifying, Driver 1 participates in the first and third sessions while Driver 2 participates in only the second session.  The fastest lap for each session is indicated with bold.

Races

Qualifying race

Race result

Championship race

Race result

External links
 Spa-Francorchamps GT1 Race in Belgium – FIA GT1 World Championship

Spa
FIA GT1